Jamal Jouhar (born 26 July 1987) is a Qatari football forward who played for Qatar in the 2004 Asian Cup. He also played for Al Ahli.

External links

11v11 Profile

Qatari footballers
1987 births
Living people
Qatar international footballers
2004 AFC Asian Cup players
Al Ahli SC (Doha) players
Al-Gharafa SC players
Al-Shahania SC players
Al-Shamal SC players
Umm Salal SC players
Qatar Stars League players
Qatari Second Division players
Association football forwards